Kurita Water Gush Akishima are a Japanese rugby union team that play in Division Three of Japan Rugby League One. They are owned by Kurita Water Industries, a water treatment chemical manufacturer. The team is based in Atsugi, Kanagawa Prefecture, Japan. The team rebranded as Kurita Water Gush Akishima ahead of the rebranding of the Top League to the Japan Rugby League One in 2022.

Squad

The Kurita Water Gush Akishima squad for the 2023 season is:

References

External links
Kurita Water Official Site

Sports teams in Kanagawa Prefecture
Rugby in Kantō
Japan Rugby League One teams
1962 establishments in Japan
Rugby clubs established in 1962